Cortactin-binding protein 2 is a protein that in humans is encoded by the CTTNBP2 gene.

Function 

This gene encodes a protein with six ankyrin repeats and several proline-rich regions. A similar gene in rat interacts with a central regulator of the actin cytoskeleton.

Interactions 

CTTNBP2 has been shown to interact with:
 MOBKL3,
 PPP2CA,
 RP6-213H19.1, 
 STRN3,  and
 STRN.

Model organisms
Model organisms have been used in the study of CTTNBP2 function. A conditional knockout mouse line called Cttnbp2tm1b(KOMP)Wtsi was generated at the Wellcome Trust Sanger Institute. Male and female animals underwent a standardized phenotypic screen to determine the effects of deletion. Additional screens performed:  - In-depth immunological phenotyping

References

External links

Further reading